Whistlefield is a hamlet on the east shore of Loch Eck on the Cowal peninsula, Argyll and Bute, West of Scotland. It is home to the Category C listed building, the Whistlefield Inn, which was established around 1801–1804. The hamlet is within the Argyll Forest Park, which is itself part of the Loch Lomond and The Trossachs National Park.

References

External links

Whistlefield
Highlands and Islands of Scotland